Jiří Kovář (born April 10, 1989) is an Italian volleyball player of Czech origins, a member of Italy men's national volleyball team and Greek club Panathinaikos. He was silver medalist of the European Championship 2013, bronze medalist of the World League 2014, and triple Italian Champion (2012, 2014 and 2017).

Career

Clubs
In 2014 won a title of Italian Champion after winning matches against Sir Safety Perugia. On October 15, 2014 Lube Banca Macerata, including Kovář, won their first trophy of the 2014/2015 season. The Macerata club beat Copra Elior Piacenza (3-2) and won Italian SuperCup2014.

National team
On July 20, 2014 Italy, including Kovář, claimed the bronze medal of the World League 2014, beating Iran 3-0. In 2014 played at World Championship 2014 held in Poland. Italy after promotion from Pool C, took 7th place in Pool E and they were eliminated from further fighting for medals. Italy took 13th place.

Sporting achievements

Clubs

FIVB Club World Championship
  Poland 2017 – with Cucine Lube Civitanova
  Brazil 2019 – with Cucine Lube Civitanova
  Brazil 2021 – with Cucine Lube Civitanova

CEV Champions League
  2018/2019 - with Cucine Lube Civitanova

CEV Cup
  2010/2011 - with Sisley Treviso

National championships
 2011/2012  Italian Championship, with Lube Banca Macerata
 2012/2013  Italian SuperCup2012, with Lube Banca Macerata
 2013/2014  Italian Championship, with Lube Banca Macerata
 2014/2015  Italian SuperCup2014, with Lube Banca Macerata
 2016/2017  Italian Cup, with Cucine Lube Civitanova
 2016/2017  Italian Championship, with Cucine Lube Civitanova

National team
 2013  CEV European Championship
 2014  FIVB World League

Individually
 2011 CEV Cup – Best Server 
 2012 Italian Championship – Most Valuable Player 
 2017 Italian Championship – Most Valuable Player 
  2017 Italian Cup – Best Receiver

References

External links
 LegaVolley Serie A player profile

1989 births
Living people
Sportspeople from Zlín
Italian men's volleyball players
Italian people of Czech descent
Italian Champions of men's volleyball
Volleyball players at the 2020 Summer Olympics
Olympic volleyball players of Italy
Panathinaikos V.C. players